Tarneit is a suburb in Melbourne, Victoria, Australia,  west of Melbourne's Central Business District, located within the City of Wyndham local government area. Tarneit recorded a population of 56,370 at the 2021 census.

Located near another emerging suburb, Truganina, Tarneit is estimated to increase to a population of over 63,000 by 2031.

History

Settlement of the area dates to the 1830s when Tarneit was used as agricultural grazing land. Tarneit was named when it was surveyed in 1839–1840 and comes from the Wathaurong word for the colour white. The road network was largely planned in a square mile grid pattern and still forms the basis of the arterial road network today. Large scale residential subdivision did not begin until the 1990s.

Land use

Tarneit has mostly been used as agricultural grazing land. However this landscape has been rapidly changing due to urban sprawl, especially in the southern part of Tarneit, including from nearby suburbs such as Hoppers Crossing, Truganina, Wyndham Vale and Werribee.

Tarneit has a number of schools established within its boundaries, including 

 Thomas Carr College, 
 Baden Powell College P-9, 
 Tarneit P-9 College, 
 St Francis of Assisi Tarneit, 
 The Islamic College of Melbourne (ICOM),
 Good News Lutheran College (GNLC).
 Tarneit Rise Primary School 

There has been much residential growth occur in the Thomas Carr District, with other schools and shopping centres planned for construction. Stage one of Tarneit Central Shopping Centre, on the south east corner of Derrimut and Leakes Roads, began construction in mid 2016, and was opened in October 2017. It includes Coles and Aldi supermarkets, Kmart, Harris Scarfe, and The Reject Shop.

Wyndham Village Shopping Centre, in the suburb's south, was completed in 2005 to serve the population in the immediate area, especially in the residential developments of Tarneit Gardens, The Rise (located on the highest point of the surrounding plains), Rose Grange and Seasons.

Tarneit Town Centre, to be developed during the 2020s, is expected to be located in the area loosely bounded by Derrimut Road to the west, Leakes Road to the south, Skeleton Creek to the east and Dry Creek to the north.

Tarneit and other neighbouring suburbs such as Truganina are expected to grow rapidly as access to land in the more established suburbs in the City of Wyndham suburbs diminishes.

Housing estates

The Tarneit area is now the site of several new housing estates, including Marigold, The Grove, Newgate, Habitat on Davis Creek Estate, Seasons Estate, The Heartlands, The Reflections Estate, Moorookyle, Tarneit Gardens, Rothwell, Ecoville, The Rise, Manhattan Place, Claremont Park, The Reserve, Rothwell Villages(NOW CREEK STONE), Riverdale Village, Westbrook, Haven, NewHaven and Rose Grange. Mooted estates include Evadene, located within the Claremont Park estate.

Transport

The Regional Rail Link opened in the area in 2015. The new station, built near the north east corner of Derrimut and Leakes Roads, provides a much faster service than the current Werribee railway line, which instead passes through Laverton and Newport. It has car parking with 1,000 spaces, ensuring Tarneit becomes a prime regional area for those who commute to the city on a regular basis. Regional Rail Link also re-directs Geelong V/Line trains from the Werribee line. Regional Rail Link opened on 21 June 2015, with Tarneit railway station coming under the metropolitan ticketing zone 2.

In 2010, the Wyndham Bus Network was extensively upgraded and now caters for commuters from Tarneit. It was upgraded again in 2015 upon the opening of the Regional Rail Link.

Leakes Road has recently undergone redevelopment and is now sealed from Fitzgerald Road to the Leakes Road overpass (passes above the Regional Rail Link) just beyond Davis Road and provides a link from the industrial areas of Altona North and Laverton North to Tarneit and Hoppers Crossing. It is planned to ease traffic congestion on Sayers Road, which services Hoppers Crossing commuters travelling to and from the city. During peak hour the road often attracts high amounts of traffic. Leakes Road has since been duplicated from Fitzgerald Road to Derrimut Road to help cater to this high amount of traffic growth.

As part of the Regional Rail Link many roads were upgraded in Tarneit. Bridges were built over the railway line at Leakes Road, Davis Road, Tarneit Road and near Tarneit railway station itself at Derrimut Road. Doing this will enable a link between the existing estates and new housing developments on the other side of the railway line in the least populated locations such as Leakes Road and Davis Road, and provided a grade separation for the commuters who already used roads such as Tarneit Road and Derrimut Road.

Sport

In December 2018 Football Federation Australia announced Western United FC would join the A-League from the 2019–20 season. For their first two seasons, the club will play at Kardinia Park in Geelong. From the 2023–24 season onwards, the club will play at the new Wyndham City Stadium to be located at Sayers Road, Tarneit. The stadium will be part of a precinct comprising a training complex and administrative headquarters.

See also
 Electoral district of Tarneit

References

External links
 Tarneit Community Website and Forums
 Tarneit Tavern Article
 The Heartlands
 The Reflections Estate
 Moorookyle
 Tarneit Gardens
 The Rise
 Evadene
 The Reserve, Tarniet
 Rothwell Villages, Tarneit
 

Suburbs of Melbourne
Suburbs of the City of Wyndham